The discography of American singer Don McLean consists of 20 studio albums, four live albums, 11 compilation albums, and 16 singles.

Studio albums

ATapestry did not chart in Australia or the UK until 1972 after the success of American Pie.
BChain Lightning also peaked at #3 on the RPM Country Albums chart in Canada.

Live albums

Compilation albums

Singles

Notes
A The original version of "Castles in the Air" was included on the Tapestry album. In February 1971, it was released as the first single from the album and reached No. 40 on the Billboard Easy Listening / Adult Contemporary chart. After the success of the "American Pie" single, "Castles in the Air" was included as the B-side to its follow-up, "Vincent", and received enough radio airplay to reach the Hot 100 chart as a "flip". McLean's 1981 version of the song, a slower ballad version of the more mid- to up-tempo original, first appeared on his album Believers, and later replaced the original version on some copies of Tapestry.
B Chart position is from the official UK "Breakers List".
C "La La Love You" reached No. 111 on the Cashbox singles chart.

Rarities

References

Discographies of American artists